The Secretary for Constitutional and Mainland Affairs is the head of the Constitutional and Mainland Affairs Bureau in Government of Hong Kong, which is responsible for promoting the Basic Law, constitutional affairs, electoral development, and coordinate liaison between the Hong Kong government and the relevant mainland China authorities, as well as to promote various regional cooperation initiatives between Hong Kong and the mainland. Prior to 2007, this post was known as the Secretary for Constitutional Affairs.

The post was known as Deputy Chief Secretary between 1985 and 1989.

List of office holders
Political party:

Secretaries for Constitutional Affairs, 1989–1997

Secretaries for Constitutional Affairs, 1997–2007

Secretaries for Constitutional and Mainland Affairs, 2007–present

References

External links
Government of HKSAR
Organisation chart of Hong Kong Government

Positions of the Hong Kong Government